Alberto Bottari de Castello (born 5 July 1942) is an Italian prelate of the Catholic Church who spent his career in the diplomatic service of the Holy See.

Biography
Alberto Bottari de Castello was born in Montebelluna, Province of Treviso in northern Italy, on 5 July 1942. He was ordained a priest on 11 September 1966.

He prepared for a diplomatic career by completing the course of study at the Pontifical Ecclesiastical Academy in 1969.

On 18 December 1999, Pope John Paul II named him a titular archbishop and nuncio to Gambia, Guinea, Liberia, and Sierra Leone. He was consecrated a bishop on 6 January 2000.

He was appointed Apostolic Nuncio to Japan on 1 April 2005.

Pope Benedict XVI named him nuncio to Hungary on 7 June 2011.

He retired after reaching the age of 75.

Hungary awarded him the Commander's Crosses with Star of the Order of Merit of the Republic of Hungary.

See also
 List of heads of the diplomatic missions of the Holy See

References

External links

1942 births
Living people
People from Montebelluna
21st-century Italian Roman Catholic titular archbishops
Apostolic Nuncios to Japan
Apostolic Nuncios to Hungary
Apostolic Nuncios to the Gambia
Apostolic Nuncios to Guinea
Apostolic Nuncios to Liberia
Apostolic Nuncios to Sierra Leone
Italian expatriates in the Gambia
Commander's Crosses with Star of the Order of Merit of the Republic of Hungary (civil)